The New Zealand cricket team toured England in the 1983 season to play a four-match Test series against England. England won the series 3-1 with no matches drawn. New Zealand won the second Test of the series, their first Test win in England. In the same match, Bob Willis became the fourth bowler to take 300 Test wickets.

Test series summary

First Test

Second Test

Third Test

Fourth Test

References

External sources
 New Zealand in England 1983 at CricketArchive

Annual reviews
 Playfair Cricket Annual 1984
 Wisden Cricketers' Almanack 1984

1983 in New Zealand cricket
1983 in English cricket
1983
International cricket competitions from 1980–81 to 1985